The 2017 IIHF World U18 Championship Division III were two international under-18 men's ice hockey tournaments organized by the International Ice Hockey Federation. The group A and B tournaments made up the sixth and seventh level of competition at the 2017 IIHF World U18 Championships.

Division III A

The Division III A tournament was played in Taipei, Taiwan, from 21 to 27 March 2017.

Participants

Match officials
4 referees and 7 linesmen were selected for the tournament.

Referees
 Jeronimus den Ridder
 Jevgeņijs Griškevičs
 Stefan Hogarth
 Bartosz Kaczmarek

Linesmen
 Jonathan Mark Burger
 Shunsuke Ichikawa
 Dustin McCrank
 Simone Mischiatti
 Laurynas Stepankevičius
 Maarten van den Acker
 Nick Verbruggen

Standings

Results
All times are local. (National Standard Time – UTC+8)

Division III B

The Division III B tournament was played in Mexico City, Mexico, from 17 to 19 March 2017.

Participants

Match officials
2 referees and 3 linesmen were selected for the tournament.

Referees
 Sean Fernandez
 Fraser Lawrence

Linesmen
 Ryan Madson
 Kelsey Mahoney
 Sem Ramirez

Standings

Results
All times are local. (Central Standard Time – UTC–6)

See also
 List of sporting events in Taiwan

References

IIHF World U18 Championship Division III
2017 IIHF World U18 Championships
International ice hockey competitions hosted by Taiwan
International ice hockey competitions hosted by Mexico
March 2017 sports events in Asia
March 2017 sports events in Mexico
Sports competitions in Taipei
Sports competitions in Mexico City